Tricholoma niveipes is a mushroom of the agaric genus Tricholoma. It was formally described as new to science by American mycologist Charles Horton Peck in 1901.

See also
List of North American Tricholoma

References

External links
 

Fungi described in 1902
Fungi of North America
niveipes